Elobod (also Yelabad) is an urban-type settlement of Qoʻngʻirot District in Karakalpakstan in Uzbekistan. Its population is 900 (2016).

References

Populated places in Karakalpakstan
Urban-type settlements in Uzbekistan